Emma Lanier McLaughlin (born February 7, 1974 in Elmira, New York) is an American novelist.

Biography
McLaughlin graduated from New York University's Gallatin School of Individualized Study.  She met Nicola Kraus while both were attending New York University, and working as nannies. Their first novel, The Nanny Diaries, a tale about a 20-something New York nanny, reached #1 on the New York Times Best Seller list in 2002.  The film version was released in 2007.

Published works

With Nicola Kraus
The Nanny Diaries (2002)
Citizen Girl (2004)
Dedication (2007)
The Real Real (2009)
Nanny Returns (2010)
The First Affair (2013)

References

External links
Emma McLaughlin and Nicola Kraus official website
Interview with Emma McLaughlin
Barnes & Noble Biography

1974 births
Living people
21st-century American novelists
American women novelists
American chick lit writers
New York University Gallatin School of Individualized Study alumni
Writers from Elmira, New York
21st-century American women writers
Novelists from New York (state)